At the Movies is the eighth studio album by saxophone player Dave Koz. It was released by Capitol Records on January 30, 2007. The album peaked at number 2 on Billboard Jazz Albums chart.

Track listing

Personnel 
 Dave Koz – alto saxophone (1, 2, 4, 7, 8, 10, 15), soprano saxophone (3, 6, 9, 11, 12), tenor saxophone (5)
 Rob Mounsey – acoustic piano (1, 5, 6, 9), arrangements (1, 5, 6, 9)
 Philippe Saisse – keyboards (1, 2, 5, 6, 7, 9, 11, 12)
 Rob Mathes – acoustic piano (2, 7, 11, 12), arrangements (2, 7, 11, 12)
 Jim Cox – keyboards (3, 4, 8, 10)
 Randy Waldman – acoustic piano (3, 8, 10), arrangements (3), Fender Rhodes (4), acoustic guitar (12)
 Barry Eastmond – acoustic piano (4)
 Krishna Balagita – keyboards (15), acoustic piano (15)
 Rodney Jones – guitars (1, 2, 5, 6, 7, 9, 11, 12)
 Jeff Mironov – guitars (1, 2, 5, 6, 7, 9, 11, 12)
 Dean Parks – acoustic guitar (3, 4, 8, 10)
 Michael Thompson – electric guitar (3, 4, 8, 10)
 Peter White – acoustic guitar (13)
 Norman Brown – electric guitar (14)
 Marshal S. Rachman – guitars (15)
 David Finck – bass (1, 2, 5, 6, 7, 9, 11, 12)
 Kevin Axt – bass (3, 4, 8, 10)
 Dika Satjadibrata – bass (15)
 Shawn Pelton – drums (1, 2, 5, 6, 7, 9, 11, 12)
 Greg Field – drums (3, 4, 8, 10)
 Rama Yaya Moektio – drums (15)
 Ken Hitchcock – alto saxophone (6)
 Roger Rosenberg – baritone saxophone (6)
 Charles Pillow – tenor saxophone (6)
 Andy Snitzer – tenor saxophone (6)
 George Flynn – bass trombone (6)
 Larry Farrell – tenor trombone (6)
 Birch Johnson – tenor trombone (6)
 Chris Botti – trumpet (5, 14)
 Jim Hynes – trumpet (6)
 Tony Kadleck – trumpet (6)
 Victor Vanacore – arrangements (4, 8, 10)
 Judy Garland – vocal introduction (1)
 Barry Manilow – vocals (2)
 Ingrid Bergman – spoken introduction (3)
 Anita Baker – vocals (4)
 Johnny Mathis – vocals (5)
 Vanessa Williams – vocals (7)
 India.Arie – vocals (9)
 Donna Summer – vocals (11)
 Donnie Sibarani – vocals (15)

Orchestra 
 Rob Mounsey – conductor (1, 3-6, 8-10)
 Rob Mathes – conductor (2, 7, 11, 12)
 Jill Dell'Abate – contractor 
 Elena Barere – concertmaster 

Horns and Woodwinds
 Marc Goldberg and Ron Jannelli – bassoon
 John Manasse, David Mann and Charles Pillow – clarinet
 David Mann, Charles Pillow and Pamela Sklar – flute
 Diane Lesser – oboe
 Diane Lesser and Bill Meredith – English horn
 Joseph Anderer, Julie Landsman, Patrick Milando, Stewart Rose and Anne Schraer – French horn
 Chris Hall – tuba

Strings
 Diane Barare, Jeanne LeBlanc, Richard Locker, Eugene Moye and Ellen Westerman – cello 
 Larry Glazener and Gail Kruvand-Moye – double bass 
 Stacey Shames – harp
 Adria Benjamin, Crystal Garner, Vincent Leonti, Craig Mumm, Maxine Roach and Judy Witmer – viola
 Abe Appleman, Avril Brown, David Chan, Cenovia Cummins, Jonathan Dinklage, Katherine Fong, Jean Ingraham, Ann Leathers, Ann Lehmann, Laura McGinnis, Jan Mullen, Richard Sortomme, Marti Sweet and Yuri Vodovoz – violin 

Percussion
 Jim Saporito – percussion 
 Joe Passaro – timpani

Production 
 Phil Ramone – producer, liner notes 
 Sue Drew – A&R 
 Frank Filipetti – recording 
 Dave O'Donnell – recording 
 Al Schmitt – recording, mixing 
 David Benson – additional engineer  
 Bruce Feagle – additional engineer 
 Jan Folkson – additional engineer 
 Michael O'Reilly – additional engineer 
 Bill Schnee – additional engineer
 Darius Fong – assistant engineer, Pro Tools operator 
 Justin Shturtz – assistant engineer 
 Angie Teo – assistant engineer 
 Tim Whitney – assistant engineer 
 Steve Genewick – mix assistant 
 Bill Smith – mix assistant 
 Andrew Felluss – Pro Tools operator 
 Sangwook Nam – mastering 
 Doug Sax – mastering 
 Jill Dell'Abate – production manager 
 Eric Roinestad – art direction, design 
 Megan Steinman – art direction
 Ellen Von Unwerth – photography
 Dave Koz – liner notes 
 W.F. Leopold Management, Inc. – management 

Studios
 Recorded at Capitol Studios (Hollywood, California); Schnee Studios (North Hollywood, California); Paul Gilman Music (Palm Springs, California); Bennett Studios (Englewood, New Jersey); Right Track Recording, Avatar Studios and Sound On Sound (New York City, New York).
 Mixed at Capitol Studios
 Mastered at The Mastering Lab (Ojai, California).

Charts

References

Dave Koz albums
2007 albums
Capitol Records albums
Instrumental albums
Covers albums